AMM was a British free improvisation group that was founded in London, England, in 1965. The group was initially composed of Keith Rowe on guitar, Lou Gare on saxophone, and Eddie Prévost on drums. The three men shared an interest in exploring music beyond the boundaries of conventional jazz, as in free jazz and free improvisation. AMM never achieved widespread popularity, but have been influential in improvised music. Most of their albums have been released by Matchless Recordings, which is run by Eddie Prévost. In a 2001 interview, Keith Rowe was asked if "AMM" was an abbreviation. He replied, "The letters AMM stand for something, but as you probably know it's a secret!"

History

1960s
AMM was initially composed of Keith Rowe on guitar, Lou Gare on saxophone and Eddie Prévost on drums. Rowe and Gare were members of Mike Westbrook's jazz band; Prévost and Gare were also in a hard bop jazz quintet. The three men shared a common interest in exploring music beyond the boundaries of conventional jazz, as part of a larger movement that helped spawn European free jazz and free improvisation.

The seeds of AMM were planted in 1965. They initially had no name, and were not really a group in the conventional sense, simply a weekend experimental workshop session at the Royal College of Art in London, centred on Gare, Rowe, and Prévost. Members of the group have come and gone over the years, but Rowe and Prévost have been present for most recordings and performances; the latter has been the only constant in the nearly seven decades of AMM music.

Musicians were free to join in, but such collaborations were often short-lived if the contributions were lacking the proper spirit: notable jazz saxophonist Steve Lacy sat in with the group but was quickly asked to stop playing. Observers were welcome, provided they were silent and did not disturb the proceedings. American saxophonist Ornette Coleman was asked to leave after he continually talked during one performance; Beatles member Paul McCartney once sat quietly through an early AMM session. When asked how he liked the music he said they went on too long.

Eventually, the group settled on a line-up of Prévost, Rowe, Gare, bassist Lawrence Sheaff and pianist/cellist Cornelius Cardew, and, in early 1966, were calling themselves AMM. However, some early performances were billed as the "Cornelius Cardew Quintet", a mistake which both irked and amused the musicians. After a few paying performances, Cardew bought two amplifiers so the other instruments could compete with the volume of Rowe's guitar. In addition to amplifying their instruments, Cardew and Gare would apply contact microphones to various common objects to amplify the sounds made by, for example, rubbing a glass jar or striking a coffee tin.

No AMM performance is ever planned; each is unique and spontaneous. The musicians tend to avoid any conventional melody, harmony or rhythm, and seek out an ensemble sound that often obscures any individual's role. It is often difficult to discern which musical instrument is making which specific sound on an AMM recording, due in part to liberal use of various extended techniques on their instruments.

AMM released their first recording, AMMusic 1966, on Elektra Records UK in 1966. It had some initial similarities to free jazz, due in part to Gare's saxophone. One critic has written, however, that the resemblance was rather slight: "the overall sound of the group, even in 1966, was so different, so idiosyncratic, that it's not at all surprising that both new jazz and contemporary classical audiences were baffled, if not horrified." Percussionist Christopher Hobbs (born in 1950 and a student of Cardew) also played with AMM in the late 1960s.

The next AMM material to see release were the important The Crypt sessions from 12 June 1968. Though the debut is regarded as a landmark recording, The Crypt was arguably even more important in establishing the droning, long-form music that would come to characterise AMM. Further "out" and even less conventional than earlier material, one critic has written of it that "an eerie sensation inevitably accompanies each listen to the raw streams of electric noise channeled on AMM's second album and early masterpiece, The Crypt. To ears informed by the twenty-first century, it's the uncanny feeling of listening to three-and-a-half decades of experimental music history as delivered in a chillingly prescient sort of reverse premonition ... It's a little unnerving that the only records that seem to accurately describe the brave new soundworld harnessed on The Crypt came into being well after its creation."

The Crypt sessions have been issued many times, twice in the 1980s as a double LP, and it is still available (with extra material, billed as "The Complete Sessions") on a double CD from Matchless Recordings. The Crypt continues to inspire adventurous listeners; in the liner notes to the 1992 double CD, Prévost writes, "Despite being (arguably) the most 'difficult' material on Matchless, The Crypt has been a mainstay for the label. It obviously pays not to underestimate the audience. Its continued success has enabled us to release other works. So we felt committed, obliged almost, to keep it available ... this music has proved itself not to be ephemeral."

Composer Cornelius Cardew joined AMM in 1966, performing on piano and cello. He worked with AMM intermittently until he abandoned his earlier experimental music in the late 1970s (Cardew died in an unsolved auto accident in 1981). Composer Christian Wolff performed with AMM in 1968. Cardew and Rowe became committed to socialism and to Maoism, and thought that AMM's music should reflect their sociopolitical outlook. Prévost accuses the pair of "cultural bullying", and there was tension in the group, resulting in some AMM performances being made by alternating duos: Rowe and Cardew, Prévost and Gare.

1970s
This personal and political tension culminated with a long period (about 1972 to 1976) when AMM was rarely active, and then usually as a Prévost-Gare duo. This was arguably AMM's most jazz-like era, with Gare's sputtering, squawking saxophone (unique but showing the influence of John Gilmore and Albert Ayler) brought to the fore, although Prévost has stated the music was "decidedly non-jazz."
 
Rowe rejoined in the mid-1970s, and shortly thereafter, Gare departed, leaving a Rowe-Prévost duo for a period.

1980s and 1990s
Pianist John Tilbury – previously an occasional AMM collaborator – joined in about 1980. This version of AMM generally explored quieter, more meditative sounds. Gare occasionally rejoined the group in this era; cellist Rohan de Saram was also an occasional addition.

Later collaborators have included saxophonist Evan Parker and clarinetist Ian Mitchell.  Christian Wolff also returned as a collaborator for a concert at the Conway Hall in London in 2001.  Prévost has reported that of all their collaborators, Parker and Wolff best grasped the AMM aesthetic.

2000s
The Prévost/Rowe/Tilbury line-up remained stable for two decades, only occasionally augmented by guests. In the early 1990s, the trio made their first extensive tours, with a number of well-received appearances in Europe and North America.

But since about 2000, Rowe's increasing involvement with what has become known as "electroacoustic improvisation" ("eai" for short), especially under the aegis of Jon Abbey's Erstwhile Records, meant that more of his musical activities began to take place outside AMM. Rowe has reported that he felt somewhat limited having been almost exclusively a Matchless Records artist, and that he wanted to explore music outside of AMM. Tension between Rowe and Prévost was exacerbated by the appearance of Prévost's second book of essays, Minute Particulars, which contained some disparaging comments about Rowe, who then left the group. In his review of Prévost's book, Walter Horn notes that while Prévost offers often scathing opinions of many people, Rowe is singled out for multiple barbs, and "one can hardly fail to wonder whether there's something of a personal nature lurking behind the barrage of what are superficially theoretical complaints."

The trio's last performance with Rowe is documented on the 2005 double-CD Apogee. The set is shared with another of the electronic improvisational ensembles that emerged during the 1960s: Musica Elettronica Viva (MEV). The first CD is a studio recording in a joint session in England on 30 April 2004 featuring MEV's Alvin Curran, Richard Teitelbaum and Frederic Rzewski with Prévost-Rowe-Tilbury. This is the first occasion that the two ensembles have performed together, but not the first time they have shared a split release: each outfit filled a side of the LP Live Electronic Music Improvised, released on a US label in 1968 (AMM's side features excerpts from The Crypt sessions; MEV's side is an excerpt from their magnum opus "Spacecraft."). The second CD consists of the performances that each group gave at a festival held in London on 1 May 2004.

Prévost and Tilbury continue to record and perform as AMM. They performed in London during December 2004, with Sachiko M joining as a guest, at the 2005 LMC Festival of Experimental Music, with David Jackman as a guest, and at a festival of experimental music in Belgium in February 2006. They also released a duo CD as AMM, Norwich, during 2005, and in 2009, the CD Trinity with guest John Butcher.
In 2010 the core duo of Eddie Prévost and John Tilbury along with John Butcher, Christian Wolff and Ute Kangiesser released a CD called "Sounding Music" (the first simply tagged as AMM after 2005's Norwich) containing the concert performed at "Freedom of the City" festival, Conway Hall, London on 3 May 2009.

More recent recordings on Matchless featuring the duo form of AMM include: 'Uncovered Correspondence' recorded in Jasło, Poland (2010) and 'Two London Concerts'  (2011).

AMM appeared on SWR2 NOWJazz Session, Donaueschingen 2012.

AMM (Tilbury, Prévost & Rowe) are due to appear on 29 November 2015 as the final performance in the Huddersfield Contemporary Music Festival.

AMM disbanded in 2022, after playing their final performance at Cafe Oto on July 30.

Critical appraisal
Michael Nyman wrote, "AMM seem to have worked without the benefit or hindrance of any kind of prepared external discipline."

Members
Lou Gare – saxophone (1965–76 and occasionally thereafter until c. 1992)
Eddie Prévost – percussion (1965–2022)
Keith Rowe – guitar (1965–2004, 2015–2022)
Cornelius Cardew – piano, cello (1966–73)
Lawrence Sheaff – accordion, cello (1966–67)
Christopher Hobbs – percussion (1968–71)
John Tilbury – piano (1980–2022)
Rohan de Saram – cello (c. 1986–94)

Discography

References

Sources
Philip Clark: The Wire Primers: A Guide To Modern Music AMM, pages 113–121; Verso, 2009; 
Michael Nyman: Experimental Music: Cage and Beyond (second edition); Cambridge University Press, 1999; 
Edwin Prévost: No Sound Is Innocent: AMM and the Practice of Self-Invention—Meta-Musical Narratives, Essays Copula, 1995; 
Edwin Prévost: Minute Particulars: Meanings in Music Making in the Wake of Hierarchical Realignments and Other Essays Copula, 2004: 
John Tilbury: Cornelius Cardew: a life unfinished chapter 7 AMM 1965 – 71, Copula 2008: 
Edwin Prévost: 'The First Concert: an adaptive appraisal of a Meta Music', Copula, 2011:

External links
AMM history & discography

Free improvisation ensembles
English experimental musical groups
British musical trios
Musical groups established in 1965